Essex County Trilogy is a collection of three graphic short stories set in Essex County, Ontario by Jeff Lemire published in 2011 by Top Shelf Productions. The three short stories are "Tales from the Farm" (2008), "Ghost Stories" (2008), and "The Country Nurse" (2009). Two other shorter stories titled "The Essex County Boxing Club" and "The Sad and Lonely Life of Eddie Elephant Ears" are also included. 

The collection won the Alex Award, the Doug Wright Award, and the Joe Shuster Award. It was also a 2011 selection for Canada Reads: The Essential Canadian Novels of the Decade. In addition, Essex County provided Jeff Lemire with a Harvey Award nomination for Best New Talent in 2008.

Publication order
Vol 1: Tales From the Farm (2008)
Vol 2: Ghost Stories (2008)
 "Essex County Boxing Club" (short) (2008)
Vol 3: The Country Nurse (2009)
 "The Sad and Lonely Life of Eddie Elephant-Ears" (2011)
Essex County (Hardcover) (2011)
Essex County (Paperback) (2011)

Adaptations 
In June 2011, it was announced that visual effects artist John Dykstra would direct an adaptation of Essex County entitled Super Zero.

In December 2015, it was announced that First Generation Films had optioned the rights to Essex County to develop the graphic novel as a television series for Canada's CBC Television. Aaron Martin is set as writer and showrunner, as well as executive producing with Lemire. The television adaptation, Essex County, is slated to premiere in March 2023.

Reception

References

2008 graphic novels
Canadian graphic novels
Comics by Jeff Lemire

Novels set in Canada
Novels set in Ontario